Deckman is a surname. Notable people with the surname include:

Joseph H. Deckman (born 1969), American businessman and lacrosse player and coach
Melissa Deckman, American political scientist
Tom Deckman (born 1979), American actor